Peshawar is the sixth largest city in Pakistan, with a population of over 2.3 million. It is situated in the north-west of the country, lying in the Valley of Peshawar. It is the capital of the province of Khyber Pakhtunkhwa, where it is the largest city. Peshawar is primarily populated by Pashtuns, who comprise the second-largest ethnic group in the country. Situated in the Valley of Peshawar, a broad area situated east of the historic Khyber Pass, Peshawar's recorded history dates back to at least 539 BCE, making it one of the oldest cities in South Asia. Peshawar is among the oldest continuously inhabited cities of the country.

The area encompassing modern-day Peshawar is mentioned in Vedic scriptures; it served as the capital of the Kushan Empire during the rule of Kanishka and was home to the Kanishka Stupa, which was among the tallest buildings in the ancient world. Peshawar was then ruled by the Hephthalites, followed by the Hindu Shahis, before the arrival of a variety of Muslim empires. The city was an important trading centre of the Mughal Empire before becoming part of the Durrani Empire in 1747, after which it served as the Durrani winter capital from 1776 until the capture of the city by the Sikh Empire in 1823. In 1849, the city was captured by the East India Company and subsequently became part of British Raj, under whose rule it remained until the Partition of British India and subsequent independence of Pakistan in 1947.

Etymology

The modern name of the city "Peshawar" is possibly derived from the [reconstructed] Sanskrit word "Purushapura" ( Puruṣapura, meaning "City of Men" or “City of Purusha"). It was named so by Mughal Emperor Akbar from its old name Parashawar, the meaning of which Akbar didn't understand. The ruler of the city during its founding may have been a Hindu raja (king) named Purush; the word pur means "city" in Sanskrit. Sanskrit, written in the Kharosthi script, was the literary language employed by the Buddhist kingdoms which ruled over the area during its earliest recorded period. The city's name may also be derived from the Sanskrit name for "City of Flowers," Poshapura, a name found in an ancient Kharosthi inscription that may refer to Peshawar.

Chinese Buddhist monk Xuanzang's seventh century account of a city in Gandhara called the city Po-la-sha-pu-lo (Chinese: 布路沙布邏, bùlùshābùló), and an earlier fifth century account by Fa-Hien records the city's name as Fou-lou-sha (Chinese: 弗樓沙, fùlóshā), the Chinese equivalent of the Sanskrit name of the city, Purushapura. An ancient inscription from the Shapur era identifies a city in the Gandhara valley by the name pskbvr, which may be a reference to Peshawar.

The Arab historian and geographer Al-Masudi noted that by the mid tenth century, the city was known as Parashāwar. The name was noted to be Purshawar and Purushavar by Al-Biruni.

The city began to be known as Peshāwar by the era of Emperor Akbar. The current name is said by some to have been based upon the Persian for "frontier town" or, more literally, "forward city," though transcription errors and linguistic shifts may account for the city's new name. One theory suggests that the city's name is derived from the Persian name "Pesh Awardan", meaning "place of first arrival" or "frontier city," as Peshawar was the first city in the Indian subcontinent after crossing the Khyber Pass.

History

Ancient history
Peshawar alongside the modern day Ghandara region were found in the Vedic Scripture as Pushkalavati.

Foundation
Peshawar was founded as the city of Puruṣapura, on the Gandhara Plains in the broad Valley of Peshawar in 100 CE. It may have been named after a Hindu raja who ruled the city who was known as Purush. The city likely first existed as a small village in the fifth century BCE, within the cultural sphere of ancient India. Puruṣapura was founded near the ancient Gandharan capital city of Pushkalavati, near present-day Charsadda.

Greek Rule
In the winter of 327–26 BCE, Alexander the Great subdued the Valley of Peshawar during his invasion of the Indus Valley, as well as the nearby Swat and Buner valleys. Following Alexander's conquest, the Valley of Peshawar came under the suzerainty of Seleucus I Nicator, founder of the Seleucid Empire. A locally-made vase fragment that was found in Peshawar depicts a scene from Sophocles' play Antigone.

Mauryan empire

Following the Seleucid–Mauryan war, the region was ceded to the Mauryan Empire in 303 BCE. Around 300 BCE, the Greek diplomat and historian Megasthenes noted that Purushapura (ancient Peshawar) was the western terminus of a Mauryan road that connected the city to the empire's capital at Pataliputra, near the city of Patna in the modern-day Indian state of Bihar.

As Mauryan power declined, the Greco-Bactrian Kingdom based in modern Afghanistan declared its independence from the Seleucid Empire, and quickly seized ancient Peshawar around 190 BCE. The city was then captured by Gondophares, founder of the Indo-Parthian Kingdom. Gondophares established the nearby Takht-i-Bahi monastery in 46 CE.

Kushan empire

In the first century of the Common era, Purushapura came under control of Kujula Kadphises, founder of the Kushan Empire. The city was made the empire's winter capital. The Kushan's summer capital at Kapisi (modern Bagram, Afghanistan) was seen as the secondary capital of the empire, while Puruṣapura was considered to be the empire's primary capital. Ancient Peshawar's population was estimated to be 120,000, which would make it the seventh-most populous city in the world at the time. As a devout Buddhist, the emperor built the grand Kanishka Mahavihara monastery. After his death, the magnificent Kanishka stupa was built in Peshawar to house Buddhist relics. The golden age of Kushan empire in Peshawar ended in 232 CE with the death of the last great Kushan king, Vasudeva I.

Around 260 CE, the armies of the Sasanid Emperor Shapur I launched an attack against Peshawar, and severely damaged Buddhist monuments and monasteries throughout the Valley of Peshawar. Shapur's campaign also resulted in damage to the city's monumental stupa and monastery. The Kushans were made subordinate to the Sasanids and their power rapidly dwindled, as the Sasanids blocked lucrative trade routes westward out of the city.

Kushan Emperor Kanishka III was able to temporarily reestablish control over the entire Valley of Peshawar after Shapur's invasion, but the city was then captured by the Central Asian Kidarite kingdom in the early 400s CE.

White Huns
The White Huns devastated ancient Peshawar in the 460s CE, and ravaged the entire region of Gandhara, destroying its numerous monasteries. The Kanishka stupa was rebuilt during the White Hun era with the construction of a tall wooden superstructure, built atop a stone base, and crowned with a 13-layer copper-gilded chatra.

In 520 CE the Chinese monk Song Yun visited Gandhara and ancient Peshawar during the White Hun era, and noted that it was in conflict with nearby Kapisa. The Chinese monk and traveler Xuanzang visited ancient Peshawar around 630 CE, after Kapisa victory, and expressed lament that the city and its great Buddhist monuments had decayed to ruin—although some monks studying Hinayana Buddhism continued to study at the monastery's ruins. Xuanzang estimated that only about 1,000 families continued in a small quarter among the ruins of the former grand capital.

Medieval history

Until the mid seventh century, the residents of ancient Peshawar had a ruling elite of Central Asian Scythian descent, who were then displaced by the Hindu Shahis of Kabul.

Islam is believed to have been first introduced to the Buddhist, Hindu and other indigenous inhabitants of Puruṣapura in the later seventh century.

As the first Pashtun tribe to settle the region, the Dilazak Pashtuns began settling in the Valley of Peshawar, and are believed to have settled regions up to the Indus River by the 11th century. The Arab historian and geographer Al-Masudi noted that by the mid tenth century, the city had become known as Parashāwar.

Ghaznavid empire

In 986–87 CE, Peshawar's first encounter with Muslim armies occurred when Sabuktigin invaded the area and fought the Hindu Shahis under their king, Anandpal.

On 28 November 1001, Sabuktigin's son Mahmud Ghazni decisively defeated the army of Raja Jayapala, son of Anandpal, at the Battle of Peshawar, and established rule of the Ghaznavid Empire in the Peshawar region.

During the Ghaznavid era, Peshawar served as an important stop between the Afghan plateau, and the Ghaznavid garrison city of Lahore. During the tenth–12th century, Peshawar served as a headquarters for Hindu Nath Panthi Yogis, who in turn are believed to have extensively interacted with Muslim Sufi mystics.

Delhi sultanate
In 1179–80, Muhammad Ghori captured Peshawar, though the city was then destroyed in the early 1200s at the hands of the Mongols. Peshawar was an important regional centre under the Lodi dynasty of Delhi Sultanate.

The Ghoryakhel Pashtuns Khalil, Muhmands, Daudzai, Chamkani tribes and some Khashi Khel Pashtuns, ancestors of modern-day Yusufzai and Gigyani Pashtuns, began settling rural regions around Peshawar in the late 15th and 16th centuries. The Ghoryakhel and Khashi Khel tribe pushed the Dilazak Pashtun tribes east of the Indus River following a battle in 1515 near the city of Mardan.

Early modern history

Mughal empire

Peshawar remained an important centre on trade routes between India and Central Asia. The Peshawar region was a cosmopolitan region in which goods, peoples, and ideas would pass along trade routes. Its importance as a trade centre is highlighted by the destruction of over one thousand camel-loads of merchandise following an accidental fire at Bala Hissar fort in 1586. Mughal rule in the area was tenuous, as Mughal suzerainty was only firmly exercised in the Peshawar valley, while the neighbouring valley of Swat was under Mughal rule only during the reign of Akbar.

In July 1526, Emperor Babur captured Peshawar from Daulat Khan Lodi. During Babur's rule, the city was known as Begram, and he rebuilt the city's fort. Babur used the city as a base for expeditions to other nearby towns in Pashtunistan.

Under the reign of Babur's son, Humayun, direct Mughal rule over the city was briefly challenged with the rise of the Pashtun king, Sher Shah Suri, who began construction of the famous Grand Trunk Road in the 16th century. Peshawar was an important trading centre on Sher Shah Suri's Grand Trunk Road. During Akbar's rule, the name of the city changed from Begram to Peshawar. In 1586, Pashtuns rose against Mughal rule during the Roshani Revolt under the leadership of Bayazid Pir Roshan, founder of the egalitarian Roshani movement, who assembled Pashtun armies in an attempted rebellion against the Mughals. The Roshani followers laid siege to the city until 1587.

Peshawar was bestowed with its own set of Shalimar Gardens during the reign of Shah Jahan, which no longer exist.

Emperor Aurangzeb's Governor of Kabul, Mohabbat Khan bin Ali Mardan Khan used Peshawar as his winter capital during the 17th century, and bestowed the city with its famous Mohabbat Khan Mosque in 1630.

Yusufzai tribes rose against Mughal rule during the Yusufzai Revolt of 1667, and engaged in pitched-battles with Mughal battalions nearby Attock. Afridi tribes resisted Mughal rule during the Afridi Revolt of the 1670s. The Afridis massacred a Mughal battalion in the nearby Khyber Pass in 1672 and shut the pass to lucrative trade routes. Mughal armies led by Emperor Aurangzeb himself regained control of the entire area in 1674.

Following Aurangzeb's death in 1707, his son Bahadur Shah I, former Governor of Peshawar and Kabul, was selected to be the Mughal Emperor. As Mughal power declined following the death of Emperor Aurangzeb, the empire's defenses were weakened.

On 18 November 1738, Peshawar was captured from the Mughal governor Nawab Nasir Khan by the Afsharid armies during the Persian invasion of the Mughal Empire under Nader Shah.

Durrani empire

In 1747, Peshawar was taken by Ahmad Shah Durrani, founder of the Afghan Durrani Empire. Under the reign of his son Timur Shah, the Mughal practice of using Kabul as a summer capital and Peshawar as a winter capital was reintroduced, with the practice maintained until the Sikh invasion. Peshawar's Bala Hissar Fort served as the residence of Afghan kings during their winter stay in Peshawar, and it was noted to be the main centre of trade between Bukhara and India by British explorer William Moorcroft during the late 1700s. Peshawar was at the centre of a productive agricultural region that provided much of north India's dried fruit.

Timur Shah's grandson, Mahmud Shah Durrani, became king, and quickly seized Peshawar from his half-brother, Shah Shujah Durrani. Shah Shujah was then himself proclaimed king in 1803, and recaptured Peshawar while Mahmud Shah was imprisoned at Bala Hissar fort until his eventual escape. In 1809, the British sent an emissary to the court of Shah Shujah in Peshawar, marking the first diplomatic meeting between the British and Afghans. His half-brother Mahmud Shah then allied himself with the Barakzai Pashtuns, and captured Peshawar once again and reigned until the Battle of Nowshera in March 1823.

Maratha Empire
The Capture of Peshawar took place in spring of 1758 when Maratha Empire in alliance with the Sikhs, defeated the Durrani Empire. The Marathas and the Sikhs were victorious in battle and Peshawar was captured thereafter. Before that, the fort of Peshawar was being guarded by Durrani troops under Timur Shah Durrani and Jahan Khan. When Raghunathrao, Malhar Rao Holkar and Sikh alliance of Charat Singh and Jassa Singh Ahluwalia left Peshawar, Tukoji Rao Holkar was appointed as the representative in this area of the sub-continent. Tukoji Rao Holkar along with Sardar Santajirao Wable and Khandoji Kadam defeated the Afghan garrison.

Peshawar was captured on 8 May 1758 by the Maratha Empire, in alliance with the Sikhs, from the Durrani Empire. The Marathas and Sikhs were victorious in the campaign in the province and Peshawar was captured. After being defeated by the army of Marathas and Sikhs, Durranis with Jahan Khan and Timur Shah Durrani left the fort and fled to Afghanistan meanwhile Marathas captured and took control of the fort. The Marathas' victory extended their rule  to the Afghan border, about 2000 km from Pune.

Sikh Empire
Ranjit Singh invaded Peshawar in 1818, but handed its rule to Peshawar Sardars as vassals. Following the Sikh victory against Azim Khan at the Battle of Nowshera in March 1823, Ranjit Singh captured Peshawar again and reinstated Yar Mohammed as the governor. By 1830, Peshawar's economy was noted by Scottish explorer Alexander Burnes to have sharply declined, with Ranjit Singh's forces having destroyed the city's palace and agricultural fields.

Much of Peshawar's caravan trade from Kabul ceased on account of skirmishes between Afghan and Sikh forces, as well as a punitive tax levied on merchants by Ranjit Singh's forces. Singh's government also required Peshawar to forfeit much of its leftover agricultural output to the Sikhs as tribute, while agriculture was further decimated by a collapse of the dried fruit market in north India. Singh appointed Neapolitan mercenary Paolo Avitabile as administrator of Peshawar, who is remembered for having unleashed a reign of terror. His time in Peshawar is known as a time of "gallows and gibbets". The city's famous Mahabat Khan, built in 1630 in the Jeweler's Bazaar, was badly damaged and desecrated by the Sikh conquerors.

The Sikh Empire formally annexed Peshawar in 1834 following advances from the armies of Hari Singh Nalwa—bringing the city under direct control of the Sikh Empire's Lahore Durbar. An 1835 attempt by Dost Muhammad Khan to re-occupy the city was unsuccessful after being unable to breach the Peshawar fort's defenses. Sikh settlers from Punjab were settled in the city during Sikh rule. The city's only remaining Gurdwaras were built by Hari Singh Nalwa to accommodate the newly-settle Sikhs. The Sikhs also rebuilt the Bala Hissar fort during their occupation of the city.

British Raj

Following the defeat of the Sikhs in the First Anglo-Sikh War in 1845-46 and the Second Anglo-Sikh War in 1849, some of their territories were captured by the British East India Company. The British re-established stability in the wake of ruinous Sikh rule. During the Sepoy Rebellion of 1857, the 4,000 members of the native garrison were disarmed without bloodshed; the absence of conflict during the rebellion meant that Peshawar was not affected by the widespread devastation that was experienced throughout the rest of British India and local chieftains sided with the British after the incident.

The British laid out the vast Peshawar Cantonment to the west of the city in 1868, and made the city its frontier headquarters. Additionally, several projects were initiated in Peshawar, including linkage of the city by railway to the rest of British India and renovation of the Mohabbat Khan mosque that had been desecrated by the Sikhs. British suzerainty over regions west of Peshawar was cemented in 1893 by Sir Mortimer Durand, foreign secretary of the British Indian government, who collaboratively demarcated the border between British controlled territories in India and Afghanistan.

The British built Cunningham clock tower in celebration of the Golden Jubilee of Queen Victoria, and in 1906 built the Victoria Hall (now home of the Peshawar Museum) in memory of Queen Victoria. The British introduced Western-style education into Peshawar with the establishment of Edwardes College and Islamia College in 1901 and 1913, along with several schools run by the Anglican Church. For better administration of the region, Peshawar and the adjoining districts were separated from the Punjab Province in 1901, after which Peshawar became capital of the new province.

Communal riots broke out in the old city of Peshawar during the spring of 1910, when the annual Hindu festival of Holi coincided with Barawafat, the annual Muslim day of mourning, resulting in a considerable loss of life along with hundreds of looted businesses and injuries. A month prior, in February 1910, prominent community religious leaders met with officials and agreed that Holi would be solely celebrated in predominantly Hindu neighbourhoods of the city, notably in Andar Shehr and Karim Pura.  On March 21st, 1910, however, rumors of musicians from Amritsar and a dancing boy from Haripur being brought into the city for Holi celebrations, led to a group of individuals who were marking Barawafat into forming a mob with the intention of stopping the procession. Despite Muslim and Hindu community leaders calling for calm, both parties ultimately clashed at the Asamai Gate, when the Holi procession was en route to Dargah Pir Ratan Nath Jee, with a Hindu procession member stabbing a Muslim individual in the mob. Riots ensued for the following three days, involved individuals from outlying tribal regions who had entered the city, with a mob at Bara Bazar allegedly chanting “Maro Hindu Ko” (Kill the Hindus). Estimates detail the riots resulted in a total of 451 damaged shops and homes, primarily belonging to members of the Hindu community, while at least 4 Muslims and 6 Hindus were killed, alongside hundreds of injuries.

Peshawar emerged as a centre for both Hindko and Pashtun intellectuals during the British era. Hindko speakers, also referred to as xāryān ("city dwellers" in Pashto), were responsible for the dominant culture for most of the time that Peshawar was under British rule. Peshawar was also home to a non-violent resistance movement led by Ghaffar Khan, a disciple of Mahatma Gandhi. In April 1930, Khan, leading a large group of his followers, protested in Qissa Khwani Bazaar against discriminatory laws that had been enacted by the colonial government; hundreds were killed when a detachment of the British Indian Army opened fire on the demonstrators.

Modern era
In 1947, Peshawar became part of the newly created state of Pakistan, and emerged as a cultural centre in the country's northwest. The partition of India saw the departure of many Hindko-speaking Hindus and Sikhs who held key positions in the economy of Peshawar. The University of Peshawar was established in the city in 1950, and augmented by the amalgamation of nearby British-era institutions into the university. Until the mid-1950s, Peshawar was enclosed within a city wall and sixteen gates. In the 1960s, Peshawar was a base for a CIA operation to spy on the Soviet Union, with the 1960 U-2 incident resulting in an aircraft shot down by the Soviets that flew from Peshawar. From the 1960s until the late 1970s, Peshawar was a major stop on the famous Hippie trail.

During the Soviet–Afghan War in the 1980s, Peshawar served as a political centre for the CIA and the Inter-Services Intelligence-trained mujahideen groups based in the camps of Afghan refugees. It also served as the primary destination for large numbers of Afghan refugees. By 1980, 100,000 refugees a month were entering the province, with 25% of all refugees living in Peshawar district in 1981. The arrival of large numbers of Afghan refugees strained Peshawar's infrastructure, and drastically altered the city's demography.

Like much of northwest Pakistan, Peshawar has been severely affected by violence from the attacks by the terrorist group, Tehrik-i-Taliban. Local poets' shrines have been targeted by the Pakistani Taliban, a suicide bomb attack targeted the historic All Saints Church in 2013, and most notably the 2014 Peshawar school massacre in which Taliban militants killed 132 school children. Peshawar suffered 111 acts of terror in 2010, which had declined to 18 in 2014, before the launch of Operation Zarb-e-Azb, which further reduced acts of violence throughout Pakistan. A large attack on a Shiite mosque in the city killed dozens and injured 200 people on 4 March 2022. In January 2023, another terrorist attack occurred at Peshawar in which 100 people were killed.

Geography

Topography

Peshawar is located in the broad Valley of Peshawar, which is surrounded by mountain ranges on three sides, with the fourth opening to the Punjab plains. The city is located in the generally level base of the valley, known as the Gandhara Plains.

Climate

With an influence from the local steppe climate, Peshawar features a hot semi-arid climate (Köppen BSh), with very hot, prolonged summers and brief, mild to cool winters. Winter in Peshawar starts in November and ends in late March, though it sometimes extends into mid-April, while the summer months are from mid-May to mid-September.

Peshawar is not a monsoon region, unlike other parts of Pakistan; however, rainfall occurs in both winter and summer. Due to western disturbances, the winter rainfall shows a higher record between the months of February and April. The average winter rainfall levels are higher than those of summer. The relative humidity varies from 46% in June to 76% in August.

Cityscape

Peshawar's urban typology is similar to other ancient cities in South Asia, such as Lahore, Multan and Delhi - all of which were founded near a major river, and included an old walled city, as well as a royal citadel.

Historically, the old city of Peshawar was a heavily guarded citadel that consisted of high walls. In the 21st century, only remnants of the walls remain, but the houses and havelis continue to be structures of significance. Most of the houses are constructed of unbaked bricks, with the incorporation of wooden structures for protection against earthquakes, with many composed of wooden doors and latticed wooden balconies. Numerous examples of the city's old architecture can still be seen in areas such as Sethi Mohallah. In the old city, located in inner-Peshawar, many historic monuments and bazaars exist in the 21st century, including the Mohabbat Khan Mosque, Kotla Mohsin Khan, Chowk Yadgar and the Qissa Khawani Bazaar. Due to the damage caused by rapid growth and development, the old walled city has been identified as an area that urgently requires restoration and protection.

The walled city was surrounded by several main gates that served as the main entry points into the city — in January 2012, an announcement was made that the government plans to address the damage that has left the gates largely non-existent over time, with all of the gates targeted for restoration.

Demographics

Population
The population of Peshawar district in 1998 was 2,026,851. The city's annual growth rate is estimated at 3.29% per year, and the 2016 population of Peshawar district is estimated to be 3,405,414. With a population of 1,970,042 according to the 2017 census, Peshawar is the sixth-largest city of Pakistan. and the largest city in Khyber Pakhtunkhwa, with a population five times higher than the second-largest city in the province.

Language 
The primary native language spoken in Peshawar is Pashto, while Hindko is native minority language, though English is used in the city's educational institutions, while Urdu is understood throughout the city - as the national language of the country.

The district of Peshawar is overwhelmingly Pashto-speaking, though the Hindko-speaking minority is concentrated in Peshawar's old city, Hindko speakers in Peshawar increasingly assimilate elements of Pashto and Urdu into their speech.

Religion
Peshawar is overwhelmingly Muslim, with Muslims making up 98.5% of the city's population in the 1998 census. Christians make up the second largest religious group with around 20,000 adherents, while over 7,000 members of the Ahmadiyya Community live in Peshawar. Hindus and Sikhs are also found in the city − though most of the city's Hindu and Sikh community migrated en masse to India following the Partition of British India in 1947.

Though the city's Sikh population drastically declined after Partition, the Sikh community has been bolstered in Peshawar by the arrival of approximately 4,000 Sikh refugees from conflict in the Federally Administered Tribal Areas; In 2008, the largest Sikh population in Pakistan was located in Peshawar. Sikhs in Peshawar self-identify as Pashtuns and speak Pashto as their mother tongue. There was a small, but, thriving Jewish community until the late 1940s. After the partition and the emergence of the State of Israel, Jews left for Israel.

Afghan refugees
Peshawar has hosted Afghan refugees since the start of the Afghan civil war in 1978, though the rate of migration drastically increased following the Soviet invasion of Afghanistan in 1979. By 1980, 100,000 refugees a month were entering the province, with 25% of all refugees living in Peshawar district in 1981. The arrival of large numbers of Afghan refugees strained Peshawar's infrastructure, and drastically altered the city's demography. During the 1988 national elections, an estimated 100,000 Afghans refugees were illegally registered to vote in Peshawar.

With the influx of Afghan refugees into Peshawar, the city became a hub for Afghan musicians and artists, as well as a major centre of Pashto literature. Some Afghan refugees have established successful businesses in Peshawar, and play an important role in the city's economy.

In recent years, Peshawar district hosts up to 20% of all Afghan refugees in Pakistan. In 2005, Peshawar district was home to 611,501 Afghan refugees — who constituted 19.7% of the district's total population. Peshawar's immediate environs were home to large Afghan refugee camps, with Jalozai camp hosting up to 300,000 refugees in 2001 – making it the largest refugee camp in Asia at the time.

Afghan refugees began to be frequently accused of involvement with terrorist attacks that occurred during Pakistan's war against radical Islamists. By 2015 the Pakistani government adopted a policy to repatriate Afghan refugees, including many who had spent their entire life in Pakistan. The policy of repatriation was also encouraged by the government of Afghanistan, though many refugees had not registered themselves in Pakistan. Unregistered refugees returning to Afghanistan without their old Afghan identification documents now have no official status in Afghanistan either.

Economy

Peshawar's economic importance has historically been linked to its privileged position at the entrance to the Khyber Pass – the ancient travel route by which most trade between Central Asia and the Indian subcontinent passed. Peshawar's economy also benefited from tourism in the mid-20th century, as the city formed a crucial part of the Hippie trail.

Peshawar's estimated monthly per capita income was ₨55,246 in 2015, compared to ₨117,924 in Islamabad, and ₨66,359 in Karachi. Peshawar's surrounding region is also relatively poor − Khyber Pakhtunkhwa's cities on average have an urban per capita income that is 20% less than Pakistan's national average for urban residents.

Peshawar was noted by the World Bank in 2014 to be at the helm of a nationwide movement to create an ecosystem for entrepreneurship, freelance jobs, and technology. The city has been host to the World Bank assisted Digital Youth Summit  — an annual event to connect the city and province's youths to opportunities in the digital economy. The 2017 event hosted 100 speakers including several international speakers, and approximately 3,000 delegates in attendance.

Industry
Peshawar's Industrial Estate on Jamrud Road is an industrial zone established in the 1960s on 868 acres. The industrial estate hosts furniture, marble industries, and food processing industries, though many of its plots remain underutilized. The Hayatabad Industrial Estate hosts 646 industrial units in Peshawar's western suburbs, though several of the units are no longer in use. As part of the China Pakistan Economic Corridor, 4 special economic zones are to be established in the province, with roads, electricity, gas, water, and security to be provided by the government. The nearby Hattar SEZ is envisioned to provide employment to 30,000 people, and is being developed at a cost of approximately $200 million with completion expected in 2017.

Employment
As a result of large numbers of displaced persons in the city, only 12% of Peshawar's residents were employed in the formalized economy in 2012. Approximately 41% of residents in 2012 were employed in personal services, while 55% of Afghan refugees in the city in 2012 were daily wage earners. By 2016, Pakistan adopted a policy to repatriate Afghan refugees.

Wages for unskilled workers in Peshawar grew on average 9.1% per year between 2002 and 2008. Following the outbreak of widespread Islamist violence in 2007, wages rose only 1.5% between 2008 and 2014. Real wages dropped for some skilled craftsmen during the period between 2008 and 2014.

Constraints
Peshawar's economy has been negatively impacted by political instability since 1979 resulting from the War in Afghanistan and subsequent strain on Peshawar's infrastructure from the influx of refugees. The poor security environment resulting from Islamist violence also impacted the city's economy. With the launch of Operation Zarb-e-Azb in 2014, the country's security environment has drastically improved.

The metropolitan economy suffers from poor infrastructure. The city's economy has also been adversely impacted by shortages of electricity and natural gas. The $54 billion China Pakistan Economic Corridor will generate over 10,000 MW by 2018 – greater than the current electricity deficit of approximately 4,500 MW. Peshawar will also be linked to ports in Karachi by uninterrupted motorway access, while passenger and freight railway tracks will be upgraded between Peshawar and Karachi.

Poor transportation is estimated to cause a loss of 4–6% of the Pakistani GDP. Peshawar for decades has suffered from chaotic, mismanaged, and inadequate public transportation and the poor public transportation also has been detrimental to the city's economy. Therefore, the government has since a new rapid bus service called BRT Peshawar covering the entire Peshawar. BRT Peshawar is now believed to be one the most advanced BRT of Pakistan

Transportation

Road
 

Peshawar's east–west growth axis is centred on the historic Grand Trunk Road that connects Peshawar to Islamabad and Lahore. The road is roughly paralleled by the M-1 Motorway between Peshawar and Islamabad, while the M-2 Motorway provides an alternate route to Lahore from Islamabad. The Grand Trunk Road also provides access to the Afghan border via the Khyber Pass, with onwards connections to Kabul and Central Asia via the Salang Pass.

Peshawar is to be completely encircled by the Peshawar Ring Road in order to divert traffic away from the city's congested centre. The road is currently under construction, with some portions open to traffic.

The Karakoram Highway provides access between the Peshawar region and western China, and an alternate route to Central Asia via Kashgar in the Chinese region of Xinjiang.

The Indus Highway provides access to points south of Peshawar, with a terminus in the southern port city of Karachi via Dera Ismail Khan and northern Sindh. The  Kohat Tunnel south of Peshawar provides access to the city of Kohat along the Indus Highway.

Motorways

Peshawar is connected to Islamabad and Rawalpindi by the 155 kilometre long M-1 Motorway. The motorway also links Peshawar to major cities in the province, such as Charsadda and Mardan. The M-1 motorway continues onwards to Lahore as part of the M-2 motorway.

Pakistan's motorway network links Peshawar to Faisalabad by the M-4 Motorway, while a new motorway network to Karachi is being built as part of the China Pakistan Economic Corridor.

The Hazara Motorway is being constructed as part of CPEC, and is providing control-access motorway travel all the way to Mansehra and Thakot via the M-1 and Hazara Motorways.

Rail
Peshawar Cantonment railway station serves as the terminus for Pakistan's -long Main Line-1 railway that connects the city to the port city of Karachi and passes through the Peshawar City railway station. The Peshawar to Karachi route is served by the Awam Express, Khushhal Khan Khattak Express, and the Khyber Mail services.

The entire Main Line-1 railway track between Karachi and Peshawar is to be overhauled at a cost of $3.65 billion for the first phase of the project, with completion by 2021. Upgrading the railway line will permit train travel at speeds of 160 kilometres per hour, versus the average  speed currently possible on existing tracks.

Peshawar was also once the terminus of the Khyber Train Safari, a tourist-oriented train that provided rail access to Landi Kotal. The service was discontinued as the security situation west of Peshawar deteriorated with the beginning of the region's Taliban insurgency.

Air
 
Peshawar is served by the Bacha Khan International Airport, located in the Peshawar Cantonment. The airport served 1,255,303 passengers between 2014 and 2015, the vast majority of whom were international travelers. The airport offers direct flights throughout Pakistan, as well as to Bahrain, Malaysia, Qatar, Saudi Arabia, and the United Arab Emirates.

Public transit
BRT Peshawar is a modern & third generation rapid bus service of Peshawar, which has started its service on 13 August 2020. It has 32 stations and 220 buses, which covers area from Chamkani to Karkhano Market. BRT Peshawar has replaced Peshawar's old, chaotic, dilapidated, and inadequate transportation system. The system has 32 stations and is mostly at grade, with four kilometres of elevated sections. The system also contains 3.5 kilometres of underpasses. BRT Peshawar is also complemented by a feeder system, with an additional 100 stations along those feeder lines.

Intercity bus
Peshawar is well-served by private buses (locally referred to as "flying coaches") and vans that offer frequent connections to throughout Khyber Pakhtunkhwa, as well as all major cities of Pakistan. The city's Daewoo Express bus terminal is located along the G.T. Road adjacent to the departure points for several other transportation companies.

Administration

Civic government

Politics
Peshawar has historically served as the political centre of the region, and is currently the capital city of Khyber Pakhtunkhwa province. The city and province have been historically regarded to be strongholds of the Awami National Party – a secular left-wing and moderate-nationalist party. The Pakistan Peoples Party had also enjoyed considerable support in the province due to its socialist agenda.

Despite being a centre for leftist politics in Khyber Pakhtunkhwa, Peshawar is still generally known throughout Pakistan for its social conservatism. Sunni Muslims in the city are regarded to be socially conservative, while the city's Shia population is considered to be more socially liberal.

A plurality of voters in Khyber Pakhtunkhwa province, of which Peshawar is the capital, elected one of Pakistan's only religiously based provincial governments during the period of military dictatorship of Pervez Musharraf. A ground-swell of anti-American sentiment after the 2001 United States invasion of Afghanistan contributed to the Islamist coalition's victory.

The Islamists introduced a range of social restrictions following the election of the Islamist Muttahida Majlis-e-Amal coalition in 2002, though Islamic Shariah law was never fully enacted. Restrictions on public musical performances were introduced, as well as a ban prohibiting music to be played in any public places, including on public transportation – which lead to the creation of a thriving underground music scene in Peshawar. In 2005, the coalition successfully passed the "Prohibition of Use of Women in Photograph Bill, 2005," leading to the removal of all public advertisements in Peshawar that featured women.

The religious coalition was swept out of power by the secular and leftist Awami National Party in elections after the fall of Musharraf in 2008, leading to the removal of the MMA's socially conservative laws. 62% of eligible voters voted in the election. The Awami National Party was targeted by Taliban militants, with hundreds of its members having been assassinated by the Pakistani Taliban.

In 2013, the centrist Pakistan Tehreek-e-Insaf was elected to power in the province on an anti-corruption platform. Peshawar city recorded a voter turnout of 80% for the 2013 elections.

Municipal services
86% of Peshawar's households have access to municipal piped water as of 2015, though 39% of Peshawar's households purchase water from private companies in 2015.

42% of Peshawar households are connected to municipal sewerage as of 2015.

Culture

Music
After the 2002 Islamist government implemented restrictions on public musical performances, a thriving underground music scene took root in Peshawar. After the start of Pakistani's Taliban insurgency in 2007–2008, militants began targeting members of Peshawar's cultural establishment. By 2007, Taliban militants began a widespread campaign of bombings against music and video shops across the Peshawar region, leading to the closure of many others. In 2009, Pashto musical artist Ayman Udas was assassinated by Taliban militants on the city's outskirts. In June 2012, a Pashto singer, Ghazala Javed, and her father were killed in Peshawar, after they had fled rural Khyber Pakhtunkhwa for the relative security of Peshawar.

Musicians began to return to the city by 2016, with a security environment greatly improved following the Operation Zarb-e-Azb in 2014 to eradicate militancy in the country. The provincial government in 2016 announced a monthly income of $300 to 500 musicians in order to help support their work, as well as a $5 million fund to "revive the rich cultural heritage of the province".

Museums

The Peshawar Museum was founded in 1907 in memory of Queen Victoria. The building features an amalgamation of British, South Asian, Hindu, Buddhist and Mughal Islamic architectural styles. The museum's collection has almost 14,000 items, and is well known for its collection of Greco-Buddhist art. The museum's ancient collection features pieces from the Gandharan, Kushan, Parthian, and Indo-Scythian periods.

Notable people

Education

Numerous educational institutes — schools, colleges and universities — are located in Peshawar. 21.6% of children between the ages of 5 and 9 were not enrolled in any school in 2013, while 16.6% of children in the 10 to 14 age range were out of school.

Currently, Peshawar has universities for all major disciplines ranging from Humanities, General Sciences, Sciences, Engineering, Medical, Agriculture and Management Sciences. The first public sector university, University of Peshawar (UOP) was established in October 1950 by the first Prime Minister of Pakistan. University of Engineering and Technology, Peshawar was established in 1980 while Agriculture University Peshawar started working in 1981. The first private sector university CECOS University of IT and Emerging Sciences was established in 1986. Institute of Management Sciences started functioning in 1995, which become degree awarding institution in 2005.

There are currently 9 Medical colleges in Peshawar, 2 in public sector while 7 in private sector. The first Medical College, Khyber Medical College, was established in 1954 as part of University of Peshawar. The first Medical University, Khyber Medical University while a women only Medical college, Khyber Girls Medical College was established in 2007.

At the start of the 21st century, a host of new private sector universities started working in Peshawar. Qurtuba University, Sarhad University of Science and IT, Fast University, Peshawar Campus and City University of Science and IT were established in 2001 while Gandhara University was inaugurated in 2002 and Abasyn University in 2007.

Shaheed Benazir Bhutto Women University, the first women university of Peshawar, started working in 2009 while private sector IQRA National University was established in 2012.

Apart from good range of universities, Peshawar has host of high quality further education (Post School) educational institutes. The most renowned are, Edwardes College founded in 1900 by Herbert Edwardes, is the oldest college in the province and Islamia College Peshawar, which was established in 1913. Islamia College became university and named as Islamia College University in 2008.

The following is a list of some of the public and private universities and colleges in Peshawar:

Abasyn University (Abasyn University, Peshawar)
Agricultural University (Peshawar)
CECOS University of IT and Emerging Sciences
City University of Science and Information Technology, Peshawar
Edwardes College
Forward Degree College
Frontier Women University
Gandhara University
Government College Hayatabad Peshawar
Government College Peshawar
Government Girls Degree College, Peshawar
Government Superior Science College Peshawar
IMSciences (Institute of Management Sciences)
Iqra National University, Peshawar (formerly Peshawar Campus of Iqra University Karachi)
Islamia College University
Jinnah College for Women
Jinnah Medical College
Khyber Girls Medical College
Khyber Medical College
Khyber Medical University
National University of Computer and Emerging Sciences, Peshawar Campus (NU-FAST)
Pakistan Forest Institute, Peshawar
Peshawar Medical College
Preston University
Qurtuba University (Qurtuba University of Science & Information Technology)
Rehman Medical College
Sarhad University of Science and Information Technology
Shaheed Benazir Bhutto Women University
University of Agriculture, Peshawar
University of Engineering and Technology, Peshawar
University of Peshawar

Landmarks
The following is a list of other significant landmarks in the city that still exist in the 21st century:
General
Governor's House
Peshawar Garrison Club – situated on Sir Syed Road near the Mall
Kotla Mohsin Khan – the residence of Mazullah Khan, 17th-century Pashtu poet
Qissa Khwani Bazaar
Kapoor Haveli Former residence of Prithviraj Kapoor – famous actor
Forts
Bala Hisar Fort
Colonial monuments
Chowk Yadgar (formerly the "Hastings Memorial")
Cunningham clock tower – built in 1900 and called "Ghanta Ghar"
Buddhist
Gorkhatri – an ancient site of Buddha's alms or begging bowl, and the headquarters of Syed Ahmad Shaheed, Governor Avitabile
Pashto Academy – the site of an ancient Buddhist university
Shahji ki Dheri – the site of the famous Kanishka stupa
Hindu
Panch Tirath – an ancient Hindu site with five sacred ponds
Gorkhatri – sacred site for Hindu yogis
Guru Gorkhnath temple
Aasamai temple – near Lady Reading Hospital (LRH)
Sikh
Sikh Gurudwara at Jogan Shah
Parks
Army Stadium
Wazir Bagh – laid in 1802, by Fatteh Khan, Prime Minister of Shah Mahmud Khan
Ali Mardan Khan Gardens (also known as Khalid bin Waleed Park) – formerly named "Company Bagh"
Shahi Bagh – a small portion constitutes the site of Arbab Niaz Stadium
Jinnah Park – A park on GT Road opposite Balahisar fort
Tatara Park – A Park located in Hayatabad
Bagh e Naran – A large park in Hayatabad. A portion of the park also has a Zoo.
Mosques
Mohabbat Khan Mosque
Qasim Ali Khan Mosque
Museums
Peshawar Museum
Zoo
Peshawar Zoo

Sports

There are hosts of sporting facilities in Peshawar. The most renowned are Arbab Niaz Stadium, and Hayatabad Cricket Stadium, which are the International cricket grounds of Peshawar and Qayyum Stadium, which is the multi sports facilities located in Peshawar cantonment.

Cricket is the most popular sport in Peshawar with Arbab Niaz Stadium as the main ground coupled with Cricket Academy. There is also small cricket ground, Peshawar Gymkhana ground, which is located adjacent to Arbab Niaz Stadium, a popular club cricket ground. The oldest international cricket ground in Peshawar however is Peshawar Club Ground, which hosted the first ever test match between Pakistan and India in 1955. The Peshawar Zalmi represents the city in the Pakistan Super League.

In 1975, the first sports complex, Qayyum Stadium was built in Peshawar while Hayatabad Sports Complex was built in the early 1990s. Both Qayyum Stadium and Hayatabad Sports Complexes are multiple sports complexes with facilities for all major indoor and outdoor sports such as football, Field Hockey ground, Squash, Swimming, Gymnasium, Board Games section, Wrestling, Boxing and Badminton. In 1991, Qayyum Stadium hosted Barcelona Olympics Qualifier Football match between Pakistan and Qatar plus it also hosted National Games in 2010. Hockey and squash are also popular in Peshawar.

Professional sports teams from Peshawar

Twin towns and sister cities

Peshawar is twinned with:
 Makassar, Indonesia

See also

Peshawari chappal
Peshawari turban
Karkhano
Kushan Empire
Kanishka
Bacha Khan
Khudai Khidmatgar
2014 Peshawar school attack
2020 Peshawar school bombing
Chapli Kabab

Notes

References

Bibliography

Ahmad, Aisha and Boase, Roger. 2003. "Pashtun Tales from the Pakistan-Afghan Frontier: From the Pakistan-Afghan Frontier." Saqi Books (1 March 2003). .
Beal, Samuel. 1884. "Si-Yu-Ki: Buddhist Records of the Western World, by Hiuen Tsiang." 2 vols. Trans. by Samuel Beal. London. Reprint: Delhi. Oriental Books Reprint Corporation. 1969.
Beal, Samuel. 1911. "The Life of Hiuen-Tsiang by the Shaman Hwui Li, with an Introduction containing an account of the Works of I-Tsing". Trans. by Samuel Beal. London. 1911. Reprint: Munshiram Manoharlal, New Delhi. 1973.
Dani, Ahmad Hasan. 1985. "Peshawar : Historic city of the Frontier" Sang-e-Meel Publications (1995). .
Dobbins, K. Walton. 1971. "The Stūpa and Vihāra of Kanishka I". The Asiatic Society of Bengal Monograph Series, Vol. XVIII. Calcutta.
Elphinstone, Mountstuart. 1815. "An account of the Kingdom of Caubul and its dependencies in Persia, Tartary, and India; comprising a view of the Afghaun nation." Akadem. Druck- u. Verlagsanst (1969).
Foucher, M. A. 1901. "Notes sur la geographie ancienne du Gandhâra (commentaire à un chaptaire de Hiuen-Tsang)." BEFEO No. 4, Oct. 1901, pp. 322–369.
Hargreaves, H. (1910–11): "Excavations at Shāh-jī-kī Dhērī"; Archaeological Survey of India, 1910–11, pp. 25–32.
Hill, John E. 2003. "Annotated Translation of the Chapter on the Western Regions according to the Hou Hanshu ." 2nd Draft Edition.
Hill, John E. 2004. "The Peoples of the West from the Weilue " 魏略 by Yu Huan 魚豢: A Third Century Chinese Account Composed between 239 and 265 CE. Draft annotated English translation.
Hopkirk, Peter. 1984. "The Great Game: The Struggle for Empire in Central Asia" Kodansha Globe; Reprint edition. .
Moorcroft, William and Trebeck, George. 1841. "Travels in the Himalayan Provinces of Hindustan and the Panjab; in Ladakh and Kashmir, in Peshawar, Kabul, Kunduz, and Bokhara... from 1819 to 1825", Vol. II. Reprint: New Delhi, Sagar Publications, 1971.
Reeves, Richard. 1985. "Passage to Peshawar: Pakistan: Between the Hindu Kush and the Arabian Sea." Holiday House September 1985. .
Imran, Imran Rashid. 2006. "Baghaat-i-Peshawar." Sarhad Conservation Network. July 2006.
Imran, Imran Rashid. 2012. "Peshawar – Faseel-e-Shehr aur Darwazay." Sarhad Conservation Network. March 2012.

External links

 
Populated places in Peshawar District
Cities in Khyber Pakhtunkhwa
Capitals of Pakistan
Metropolitan areas of Pakistan
Populated places along the Silk Road
Populated places established in the 5th millennium BC
5th-millennium BC establishments
Cities in Pakistan